Coryton may refer to several places in the United Kingdom:
Coryton, Cardiff, Wales
 Coryton railway station (Cardiff), still in use
Coryton Refinery, Essex, England, oil refinery and former village
 Coryton (Essex) railway station, a closed railway station in Britain, closed 1952
Coryton, Devon, England
 Coryton railway station (Devon), closed 1962
 Coryton Cove at Dawlish in Devon, location of Coryton Tunnel
Coryton baronets
 Coryton (surname)

See also
John Coryton (disambiguation)